The Atatürk National Children' Hospital is a children's hospital located in Kabul, Afghanistan, and is the second-largest children's hospital in the city.

It is administered by the Government of Afghanistan and is one of only two hospitals in Kabul to be owned by the national government. It is located nearby Kabul University.

Gulam Hasan Kamil is the chief physician.

History 
The hospital receives large amounts of funding and is closely tied to the Turkish Cooperation and Coordination Agency (TİKA). In 2000 the Turkish government sent $15,000 to the hospital and in 2012 sent five ambulances carrying 40 pieces of equipment to the hospital.

On June 27, 2019, a doctor at the hospital was beaten and given death threats by a police officer. Many staff members went on strike in protest.

After a massacre by terrorists in the Dasht-e-Barchi hospital on 12 May 2020, all babies inside the hospital were moved to the Atatürk Children' Hospital. It was visited by UNICEF representatives on 20 September 2021.

On 2 March 2022, TİKA announced it had drilled a  well for the hospital after concerns it was facing issues over the water supply. That same year the Yunus Emre Institute said it had opened a Turkish-language course for professionals in the hospital.

See also 

 Indira Gandhi Children's Hospital

References 

Hospitals in Kabul
Children's hospitals in Afghanistan
Afghanistan–Turkey relations
Children's Hospital